Meri Ladli is a 2012 Pakistani romantic drama serial, directed by Nadeem Siddique, written by Maha Malik and produced by A & B Entertainment. The drama aired on ARY Digital and has gained a large following globally and is critically acclaimed. It was received as one of the most watched TV serial with the highest TRP at that time.

In 2016, the show was rebroadcast on ARY Digital's sister channel ARY Zindagi.

Plot 
As a young woman, Aarfah ran away from home to marry Sajid. But her new life is filled with hardships; her mother in-law dislikes her from the start. Sajid, under the influence of his mother, starts to hate her as well. When Aarfah gives birth to a girl, Eesha, she is divorced and thrown out from the house. In severe financial crisis and desperation, she returns to her parents' home and after some resistance, she is allowed back. But her life resembles the same fate as that of a house help. Her brother's wife Fakhira hates her, and does everything she can to make sure that Aarfah feels unwelcome. Fakhira's daughter Rafia and Eesha grow older together and become friends much to the disapproval of Fakhira. Some years later, Tabraiz arrives from England, and both girls develop feelings towards him. Both of the mothers want their daughters to marry Tabraiz, who only has feelings for Eesha. As the story unfolds, the viewers witness the never-ending harshness of Fakhira, the sacrifices made by Aarfah and her death – and the emotional turmoil that both Eesha and Rafia go through during their lives.

Fakhira gets Eesha married against her will in a middle-class family with Abdul Hadi (Sami Khan) who is already married to another woman and lives in another city. His only reason for marrying Eesha is to have someone to take care of his aging parents while he is away. Eesha soon wins her in-laws hearts by her serenity and good nature and she pursues her education in medicine. When Abdul Hadi starts start a family he wishes to go back to his parents to which his wife does not approve of.

Meanwhile, a heartbroken Tabraiz leaves for England and Fakhira gets Rafia married into an elite class rich family. Little do they know that karma is going to hit upon her as Rafia's husband Arbaaz is an alcoholic and a divorcé. He starts abusing Rafia and stealing her things for his craving for alcohol and girlfriend Sweety. Things get worse and Rafia leaves Arbaaz. This serves as a wake up call to Fakhira and she apologizes for all her wrongdoings to Eesha. She offers Eesha to obtain divorce and remarry Tabraiz. Tabraiz also returns for Eesha, knowing her story. However, Eesha is on better terms with her husband, who is secretly in love with Eesha now, and asks Tabraiz to marry Rafia. In the end we see Rafia living happily ever after with Tabraiz and Eesha with Abdul Hadi.

Cast 
 Sajal Aly as Eesha
 Urwa Hocane as Rafia
 Sami Khan as Abdul Hadi
 Ahsan Khan as Tabraiz
 Adil Murad as Sajid
 Faizan Khawaja as Arbaaz
 Maria Wasti as Arfa (Eesha's mother)
 Faraz Farooqui as Gulsher
 Akhtar Hasnain as Rafia's father
 Tehreem Zuberi as Rafia's mother
 Qaiser Naqvi as Ahsan's mother
 Abdullah Akram (Qatar)

Soundtrack 
Meri Ladli's title song was sung by Wardah Lodhi, composition by Waqar Ali, lyrics S.K Khalish, written by Maha Malik.

Reception 
The drama has received overwhelmingly positive reviews from critics.

Meri Ladli was ranking in 3 most watchable serial after Hum TV serial Humsafar, Urdu 1 serial Ishq-e-Memnu (Turkish serial dubbed in Urdu).

See also
 List of Pakistani television serials

References

External links

2012 Pakistani television series debuts
Pakistani drama television series
Urdu-language television shows
ARY Digital original programming
2012 Pakistani television series endings